Modabad (also Romanized as Modābād, Madābād, and Mudābād; also known as Ḩamedābād and Hamūdābād) is a village in Japelaq-e Sharqi Rural District, Japelaq District, Azna County, Lorestan Province, Iran. At the 2006 census, its population was 811, in 215 families.

References 

Towns and villages in Azna County